Al-Buwaydah is a Syrian village located in Markaz Rif Dimashq, Douma District. Al-Buwaydah had a population of 8,832 in the 2004 census.

See also

References

Populated places in Markaz Rif Dimashq District